Helwingia japonica, the Japanese helwingia, is a species of Helwingia native to East Asia. Helwingia japonica is part of the genus Helwingia and the family Helwingiaceae.

Description 
The lateral and midvein are concave, and the leaves' colors are green. Flowers grow from the center of the leaf midribs, taking the shape of a simple umbel inflorescence. In male species, 3–10 small green or purplish- green flowers grow but only 3–5 will open simultaneously. The female plants have 1–3 flowers. Flowering takes place between April to May, and fruiting is from August to September.

Reproduction 
The Helwingia japonica is a dioecious plant. This means that distinctive sexual functions can be found in the male and female plants. In the male plant, the flowers have a small calyx with 3–5 stamens and one long pedicel. The female plant has a short pedicel and one pistil, with 3–5 stigma branches. Its flowers contain no stamens, but have an inferior ovary that has 3–5 ovules. For reproduction to take place, it requires pollination. The female plants flowers will then turn into fruits. The fruits are small black or red berries.

Cultivation 
They can be grown in places that are moist with good drainage, such as in partially shaded areas. Mature seed can be collected from fruit be put to storage or sowed after being rinsed and left to dry.

Range
Helwingia japonica is found in moist rich soil in forests and thickets in hills and low mountains at elevations of  meters in Japan, Bhutan, South Korea, Myanmar, and in multiple Chinese provinces.

Uses 
The plants are edible. The young leaves are used for culinary purposes, such as being cooked with rice or boiled. The flowers can also be eaten.

One source mentions the use of the plant for medical purposes, such to activate blood circulation, remove blood stasis, help with urination pain, and the use of the fruit to relieve stomach aches.

Subspecies

The species is divided into the following subspecies and varieties:

Helwingia japonica subsp. japonica
Helwingia japonica subsp. liukiuensis
Helwingia japonica subsp. taiwaniana
Helwingia japonica var. formosana
Helwingia japonica var. hypoleuca
Helwingia japonica var. papillosa
Helwingia japonica var. parviflora

References 

Aquifoliales